Francisco Luis García (born 30 October 1970) is a former Argentine rugby union player. He played as a centre.

García was a player for Asociación Alumni.

He had 13 caps for Argentina, from 1994 to 1998, scoring 2 tries, 10 points in aggregate. He was called for the 1995 Rugby World Cup, but never played.

References

External links
Francisco García International Statistics

1970 births
Living people
Argentine rugby union players
Argentina international rugby union players
Asociación Alumni players
Rugby union centres